The non-marine mollusks of Thailand are a part of the molluscan fauna of Thailand (the wildlife of Thailand). A number of species of non-marine mollusks are found in the wild in Thailand.

There is known at least 23 families, 57 genera and 125 species of land gastropods from Eastern Thailand.

There is known at least 8 species of freshwater gastropods and at least 2 species of freshwater bivalves from the Sakaeo Province in the Eastern Thailand.

Many of the freshwater species are traditionally used as food.

Summary table of number of species

Freshwater gastropods

The lower Mekong River area, which includes parts of Thailand, Laos and Cambodia, is considered to be a biodiversity hotspot for freshwater gastropods, with dominant taxa from the families Pomatiopsidae, Stenothyridae, Buccinidae and Marginellidae.

Ampullariidae
 Pila ampullacea (Linnaeus, 1758)
 Pila pesmei (Morelet, 1889)
 Pila polita (Deshayes, 1830)

Viviparidae
 Bellamya chinensis (Gray, 1834)
 Eyriesia eyriesi (Morelet, 1865)
 Filopaludina martensii martensii (Frauenfeld, 1865)
 Filopaludina sumatrensis (Dunker, 1852) – Filopaludina sumatrensis polygramma and Filopaludina sumatrensis speciosa

Pachychilidae
 Sulcospira housei (I. Lea, 1856)

Thiaridae
 Melanoides jugicostis (Hanley and Theobald, 1876)
 Tarebia granifera (Lamarck, 1822)
 Thiara scabra (Müller, 1774)
 Melanoides tuberculata (O. F. Müller, 1774)

Bithyniidae
 Bithynia funiculata (Walker, 1927)
 Bithynia siamensis (Morelet, 1866) –  Bithynia siamensis siamensis (Morelet, 1866) and Bithynia siamensis goniomphalos (Morelet, 1866)
 Gabbia erawanensis (Prayoonhong, Chitramvong & Upatham, 1990)
 Gabbia pygmaea (Preston, 1908)
 Gabbia wykoffi (Brandt, 1968)
 Hydrobioides nassa (Theobald, 1865)
 Wattebledia baschi (Brandt, 1968)
 Wattebledia crosseana (Wattebled, 1886)
 Wattebledia siamensis (Moellendorff, 1902)

Pomatiopsidae
 Tricula bollingi Davis, 1968

Buccinidae
 Clea helena (Meder in Philippi, 1847)

Land gastropods
Hydrocenidae
 5 species of Georissa or 4 species or 3

Cyclophoridae
 Cyclophorus affinis Theobald, 1858
 Cyclophorus amoenus (Pfeiffer, 1854)
 Cyclophorus aquilus (Sowerby, 1843)
 Cyclophorus aurantiacus pernobilis Gould, 1844
 Cyclophorus bensoni (Pfeiffer, 1854)
 Cyclophorus cantori (Benson, 1851)
 Cyclophorus consociatus Smith, 1893
 Cyclophorus courbeti courbeti Ancey, 1888
 Cyclophorus cryptomphalus Benson, 1857
 Cyclophorus expansus (Pfeiffer, 1853)
 Cyclophorus floridus (Pfeiffer, 1854)
 Cyclophorus fulguratus Pfeiffer, 1852
 Cyclophorus haughtoni Theobald, 1858
 Cyclophorus herklotsi Martens, 1861
 Cyclophorus labiosus (Pfeiffer, 1854)
 Cyclophorus malayanus (Benson, 1852) – indigenous
 Cyclophorus pfeifferi Reeve, 1861
 Cyclophorus saturnus Pfeiffer, 1862
 Cyclophorus siamensis (Sowerby, 1850)
 Cyclophorus songmaensis Morlet, 1891
 Cyclophorus speciosus (Philippi, 1847)
 Cyclophorus subfloridus Ancey, 1888
 Cyclophorus volvulus (O. F. Müller, 1774) – indigenous
 Cyclophorus zebrinus (Benson, 1836)
 Cyclophorus sp.
 Cyclotus setosus (Möllendorff, 1894)
 Leptopoma perlucidum (Grateloup, 1840)
 Leptopoma roepstorffianum G. Nevill, 1878
 Leptopoma vitreum (Lesson, 1831) – indigenous
 3 Leptopoma sp.
 Pterocyclus cf. cuming
 Pearsonia lamphunensis S. Tumpeesuwan & C. Tumpeesuwan, 2015
 Pterocyclus sp. – indigenous
 Rhiostoma cambodjensis Morelet, 1875– indigenous
 Rhiostoma housei (Haines, 1855)– indigenous
 Rhiostoma smithi Bartsch, 1932
 Scabrina laotica Möllendorff, 1897

 Alycaeus sp. A – E
 Diolyx sp.

Diplommatinidae
 Diplommatina burapha Dumrongrojwattana, Kamtuptim & Wongkamhaeng, 2020
 Diplommatina chadathongae Kamtuptim, Dumrongrojwattana & Wongkamhaeng, 2020
 Diplommatina chantaburiensis Dumrongrojwattana, Kamtuptim & Wongkamhaeng, 2020
 Diplommatina crispata khaochamaoensis Panha et al., 1998
 Diplommatina doichiangdao Panha & Burch, 1998
 Diplommatina fusiformis Dumrongrojwattana, Kamtuptim & Wongkamhaeng, 2020
 Diplommatina khwantongae Dumrongrojwattana, Kamtuptim & Wongkamhaeng, 2020

Pupinidae
 Pupina bipalatalis O. Boettger, 1890
 cf. Pupina compacta Möllendorff, 1897
 Pupina siamensis Möllendorff, 1902
 Pupina sp.
 Tortulosa tortuosa (Gray, 1825)

Ellobiidae
 Auriculastra elongata (Küster, 1845)
 Cassidula aurisfelis (Bruguière, 1789)
 Cassidula mustelina (Deshayes, 1830)
 Cassidula multiplicata Martens, 1865
 Ellobium aurismidae (Linnaeus, 1758)
 Ellobium aurisjudae (Linnaeus, 1758)
 Laemodonta siamensis (Morelet, 1875)
 Laemodonta punctigera (H. Adams & A. Adams, 1854)
 Laemodonta punctatostriata (H. Adams & A. Adams, 1854)
 Melampus siamemsis E. von Martens, 1865
 Melampus cf. castaneus Melampus sp.
 Pythia plicata (Férussac, 1821)
 Pythia trigona (Troschel, 1838)

Amphibolidae
 Salinator sp.

Onchidiidae
 Onchidium sp. A – B
 Platevindax sp.

Rathouisiidae
 Atopos sp.

Veronicellidae
 Semperula sp.

Pupillidae
 Acinolaemus colpodon F. G. Thompson & Upatham, 1997
 Acinolaemus stenopus F. G. Thompson & Upatham, 1997
 Acinolaemus sp. A – C
 Anauchen srakeoensis Panha & J. B. Burch, 2004
 Anauchen srakeo Aulacospira khaopratun Dumrongrojwattana & Panha, 2005
 Aulacospira depressus P. Dumrongrojwattana & S. Panha, 2006
 Aulacospira platychoncha P. Dumrongrojwattana, 2006
 Aulacospira pluangtong S. Panha & J.B. Burch, 2004
 Aulacospira samaesarnensis P. Dumrongrojwattana, 2006
 Aulacospira tamkhaobote P. Dumrongrojwattana, 2006
 Gastrocopta pisiti P. Dumrongrojwattana, 2006
 Gastrocopta sp.
 Gyliotrachela diarmaidi Panha & JB Burch, 2003
 Gyliotrachela haochongensis S. Panha & J.B. Burch, 2002
 Gyliotrachela khaochakan S. Panha & J.B. Burch, 2002 / Gyliotrachela khaochagan Gyliotrachela khawongensis Panha, 1997
 Gyliotrachela srirachaensis Panha & J. B. Burch, 2004
 Gyliotrachela srichang (Panha & J. B. Burch, 2002)
 Gyliotrachela srakaewensis P. Dumrongrojwattana, 2006
 Gyliotrachela sp.
 Hypselostoma khaowongensis Panha, 1997
 Nesopupa sp. A – B
 Systellostoma sp.

Clausiliidae
 Oospira cambodjensis L. Pfeiffer, 1861

Subulinidae
 Lamellaxis gracilis (Hutton, 1834)

Achatinidae
 Achatina fulica Bowdich, 1822

Pyramidulidae
 Pyramidula sp.

Streptaxidae
 Discartemon moolenbeeki Maassen, 2016
 Odontartemon costulatus O. F. von Möllendorff, 1883
 Odontartemon sp.
 Gonaxis protractus (A. A. Gould, 1856)
 Perrottetia aquilonaria Siriboon & Panha, 2013
 Perrottetia dermapyrrhosa Siriboon & Panha, 2013
 Perrottetia phuphamanensis Siriboon & Panha, 2013

Diapheridae
 Diaphera prima Panha, 2010
 Diaphera sp. A – D
 Sinoennea loeiensis Tanmuangpak & Tumpeesuwan, 2015
 Sinoennea panhai Páll-Gergely & Hunyadi in Páll-Gergely, A. Reischütz, Maassen, Grego & Hunyadi, 2020
 Sinoennea prima Panha & J. B. Burch, 1999
 Sinoennea ranongensis Panha, 2005
 Sinoennea reischuetzorum Maassen, 2016
 Sinoennea stunensis Dumrongrojwattana & Wongkamhaeng, 2013
 Sinoennea sutchariti Páll-Gergely & Hunyadi in Páll-Gergely, A. Reischütz, Maassen, Grego & Hunyadi, 2020

Plectopylidae
 Plectopylis achatina (J.E. Gray, 1834)

Succineidae
 Succinea sp.

Trochomorphidae
 Trochomorpha sp.

Dyakiidae
 Dyakia salangana (Martens, 1883)
 Phuphania costata Tumpeesuwan & Tumpeesuwan, 2014
 Phuphania globosa Tumpeesuwan, Naggs & Panha, 2007
 Quantula weinkauffiana (Moellendorff, 1894) – photo of the shell. Is Quantula weinkauffiana synonym for Quantula striata or for Hemiplecta weinkauffiana (Crosse & Fischer)? cf. Daston & Copeland (1993).

Gastrodontidae
 Poecilozonites sp.

Zonitidae
 Videna sp. A – B

Helicarionidae
 Aenigmatoconcha clivicola C. Tumpeesuwan & S. Tumpeesuwan, 2017
 Aenigmatoconcha sumonthai Tumpeesuwan & Tumpeesuwan, 2018
 Durgella libas Solem, 1966
 Sesara megalodon Blanford, 1902
 Sesara parva Solem, 1966
 Sesara triodon Tanmuangpak & Tumpeesuwan in Tanmuangpak, Tumpeesuwan & Tumpeesuwan, 2017

Ariophantidae
 Austenia sp.
 Cryptaustenia sp.
 Cryptozona siamensis (L. Pfeiffer, 1856)
 Hemiplecta distincta (Pfeiffer, 1851)
 Hemiplecta siamensis (L. Pfeiffer, 1856)
 Hemiplecta weinkauffiana (J. C. H. Crosse)
 Macrochlamys limbata Möllendorff, 1894
 Macrochlamys sp. 1
 Macrochlamys sp. 2
 Macrochlamys sp. A – C
 Megaustenia siamensis (Haines, 1855)
 Parmarion sp.
 Syama splendens (Benson, 1838)

Bradybaenidae
 Aegista sp.
 Pseudobuliminus siamensis (J. H. Redfield, 1853)

Camaenidae
 Amphidromus atricallosus (Gould, 1843)
 Amphidromus inversus O. F. Müller, 1774
 Amphidromus schomburgki (Pfeiffer, 1860)
 Amphidromus xiengensis Morlet, 1891
 Amphidromus cf. areolatus (Pfeiffer, 1861)
 Amphidromus (Syndromus) sp.
 Amphidromus sp. A – B
 Chloritis diplochone Möllendorff, 1898
 Chloritis siamensis Möllendorff, 1902
 Ganesella cf. capitium Ganesella sp.
 Landouria winteriana (Pfeiffer, 1842)

Freshwater bivalves

Unionidae
 Pilsbryoconcha exilis (I. Lea, 1838) – Pilsbryoconcha exilis exilis and Pilsbryoconcha exilis compressa Scabies phaselus (Lea, 1856)

See also
Molluscs of surrounding countries:
 List of non-marine molluscs of Cambodia
 List of non-marine molluscs of Laos
 List of non-marine molluscs of Malaysia
 List of non-marine molluscs of Myanmar

General:
 List of species native to Thailand

References

Further reading
 Brandt R. A. M. (1974). "The non-marine aquatic Mollusca of Thailand". Archiv für Molluskenkunde 105: 1–423.
  Chidchua W. & Dumrongrojwattana P. (file created 12 January 2010). "อนุกรมวิธานของหอยทากบกในเขตอําเภอแกลง จังหวัดระยอง และอําเภอแก่ งหางแมว จังหวัดจันทบุรี "Taxonomy of Land Snails in Klaeng District Rayong Province and Kaenghangmaew District Chanthaburi Province, Eastern Thailand (Gastropoda: Prosobranchia, Pulmonata)". 10 pp., pages unnumbered. PDF.
 Chitramvong Y. P. (1991). "The Bithyniidae (Gastropoda: Prosobranchla) of Thailand: comparative internal anatomy. Walkerana 5(14): 161–206. PDF.
 Dumrongrojwattana P. & Panha S. (2005). "A new species of Aulacospira from Thailand (Pulmonata: Stylommatophora : Pupillidae)". The Natural History Journal of Chulalongkorn University 5(1): 15–16.
 Dumrongrojwattana P. & Panha S. (2006). "Two new species of Aulacospira from Thailand (Pulmonata: Stylommatophora: Pupillidae)". The Natural History Journal of Chulalongkorn University.
  Dumrongrojwattana P., Khunsook C. & Mutchacheep S. (2006, Thai solar calendar: 2549). "การศึกษาจํานวนโครโมโซมของหอยทากบก จํานวน 13 ชนิดของประเทศไทย (Gastropoda : Pulmonata: Stylommatophora). Chromosome Study of thirteen Land Pulmonate Snails in Thailand (Gastropoda : Pulmonata : Stylommatophora)". Proceedings of 44th Kasetsart University Annual Conference: Science, Bangkok, 345–352, 8 pp., HTM, PDF. Last change of the file: 1 April 2006.
  Hemmen J. & Hemmen C. (2001). "Aktualisierte liste der terrestrischen gastropoden Thailands". Schr. Malakozool. 18: 35–70.
 Panha S. (1996). "A checklist and classification of the terrestrial pulmonate snails of Thailand". Walkerana 8(19): 31–40.
 Panha S. &  Burch J. B. (2005). "An introduction to the microsnails of Thailand". Malacological review 37–38: 1–155.
 Solem A. (1965). "Land snails of the genus Amphidromus from Thailand (Mollusca: Pulmonata: Camaenidae)". Proceedings of the United States National Museum 117: 615–631.
 Solem A. (1966). "Some non-marine mollusks from Thailand, with notes on classification of the Helicarionidae". Spolia Zoologica Musei Hauniensis 24: 1–114.
 Sri-aroon P., Butraporn P., Limsoomboon J., Kaewpoolsri M., Chusongsang Y., Charoenjai P., Chusongsang P., Numnuan S. & Kiatsiri S. (2007). "Freshwater mollusks at designated areas in eleven provinces of Thailand according to the water resource development projects". The Southeast Asian journal of tropical medicine and public health 38: 294–301. PDF.
 Thompson F. G. & Upatham S. (1997). "Vertiginid land snails from Thailand (Gastropoda, Pulmonata, Pupilloidea)". Bulletin of the Florida Museum of Natural History'' 39(7): 221–245.

 01

Molluscs
Thailand
Thailand